China Immigration Inspection (Abbreviation: CII) is the government agency responsible for controlling the sea, air and land border checkpoints of the People's Republic of China. It is a child agency of the National Immigration Administration (NIA) which in itself is subordinate to the Ministry of Public Security (MPS).

CII is charged with safeguarding national sovereignty, security and social order for transportation and immigration at key ports throughout the country.

History 
In 1988, the frontier inspection stations of 9 cities: Beijing, Tianjin, Shanghai, Guangzhou, Shenzhen, Zhuhai, Xiamen, Haikou, and Shantou engaged in a reform of the active duty system to change the uniform of border inspection officer to that of the people's police. Other border checkpoint officers continued to wear the uniforms of the People's Armed Police (PAP). On December 31, 2018, under newly announced reforms, all entry-exit border checkpoints across China were unified under the control of the newly created the NIA.

In 2011, according to the approval of the Central Organization Office, the specifications of 7 professional border inspection stations including the Shenzhen General Border Inspection Station were adjusted from the deputy department level to the main department level, and the institutional affiliation and staffing remained unchanged  .

On March 21, 2018, according to the document: "Deepening the Reform of Party and State Institutions" issued by the Central Committee of the Chinese Communist Party stated that public security border troops would no longer be listed as armed police forces, and all existing forces would be retired from active service.

On January 1, 2019, the public security border guards held a collective change-up ceremony to reorganize and professionalise border inspection agencies across the country. The badge on the left side of the uniform was unified as "Immigration Bureau" (in January 2019). A month earlier, the frontier inspection agencies in Beijing, Tianjin, Shanghai, Guangzhou, Shenzhen, Zhuhai, Xiamen, Haikou, and Shantou had their badges on the left side of their uniforms marked with the words "Frontier Inspection"). In this institutional reform, the original provincial-level corps of the public security frontier defense forces were transferred and collectively retired from active service. 

The provincial (regional) entry-exit border inspection station was adjusted and the border management corps of the public security department of the province (region) was added. Vertical integration by the National Immigration Administration occurred through the revocation of Shantou Entry-Exit Border Inspection General Station, Guangdong Province, Fujian Province, and Hainan Provincial Public Security Frontier Defense Corps. The immigration border inspection stations under this new administration are Guangzhou Entry-Exit Border Inspection General Station, Shenzhen Entry-Exit Border Inspection General Station, and Zhuhai Entry-Exit Border Inspection General Station, Xiamen Entry-Exit Border Inspection General Station and Haikou Entry-Exit Border Inspection General Station. Post reform, the State Immigration Administration led the management of 33 entry-exit border inspection stations.

Organization 
The day-to-day operations of border inspection agencies are handled by the entry and exit administration bureaus of respective provinces, autonomous regions, and municipalities directly under the auspices of the central government, while the entry and exit border inspection stations of provincial administrative regions are under the direct control of the National Immigration Administration (NIA)(a child agency of the Ministry of Public Security) The administration manages more than 270 air, land and sea border checkpoints across China.

China Immigration Inspection (CII) operates as a child agency of MPS. They are responsible for safeguarding national sovereignty, security, social order, management, and transportation upon entry and exit.

Administrative work related to visa issuance and residency registration are handled by the entry-exit administration bureaus of the public security bureaus of respective provinces, autonomous regions and municipalities directly under the central government. Chinese border authorities also administer entry and exit border inspection posts of Beijing, Tianjin, Shanghai, Guangzhou, Shenzhen, Xiamen, Zhuhai, Shantou and Haikou.

In 2009, China had 277 border control checkpoints, covering entry into China by air, water and land in conjunction with CII (China Immigration Inspection).

Enforcement of Exit Bans 
The agency is responsible for the enforcement of controversial exit bans, which restrict the ability of both Chinese citizens and foreign residents from leaving China, often on vaguely defined legal grounds with little to no warning. In November 2018, two Chinese American citizens Victor and Cynthia Liu were barred from exiting China on the basis the sibling's father; a former state owned enterprise official was wanted by Chinese authorities on corruption and financial fraud charges.  

In May 2020, two other Chinese American citizens Daniel Hsu and Jodie Chen were also barred from leaving the country on the basis that Hsu's father embezzled some 447,874 RMB (62,000 USD) while serving as the chairman of Shanghai Anhui Yu’an Industrial Corporation, a developer owned by the Anhui Provincial People’s Government. Despite Hsu himself not being subject to any charges, he and his wife were both denied exit. Critics have often derided the use of exit bans as a form of collective punishment and in violation of basic human rights. 

The use exit bans and detentions on family members of corruption suspects is a frequent tactic employed by the Ministry of Public Security (CII's parent agency) to pressure suspects to return to China to face prosecution.  Exit bans also form the basis of China's social credit system in which delinquent debtors are placed on blacklists by Chinese courts which prevent them from leaving the country as a way of encouraging the payment of debts owed. As of 2017, some 6.7 million people had been subject to such treatment according to reporting from the Financial Times.

Exit bans are also frequently used by the ministry to prevent political dissidents and activists from leaving the country as a way of suppressing and containing dissent within overseas Chinese diaspora communities. Although exact numbers are unclear, the total estimated number of dissidents and political activists prevented from leaving the country is said to reach into the tens of thousands according to a report by Foreign Policy.

References 

Government agencies of China
Immigration to China
Immigration services